The Supreme Court of Pennsylvania is the highest court in the Commonwealth of Pennsylvania's Unified Judicial System. It also claims to be the oldest appellate court in the United States, a claim that is disputed by the Massachusetts Supreme Judicial Court. The Supreme Court of Pennsylvania began in 1684 as the Provincial Court, and casual references to it as the "Supreme Court" of Pennsylvania were made official in 1722 upon its reorganization as an entity separate from the control of the royal governor. Today, the Supreme Court of Pennsylvania maintains a discretionary docket, meaning that the Court may choose which cases it accepts, with the exception of mandatory death penalty appeals, and certain appeals from the original jurisdiction of the Commonwealth Court. This discretion allows the Court to wield powerful influence on the formation and interpretation of Pennsylvania law.

History

The Original Pennsylvania constitutions, drafted by William Penn, established a Provincial Court under the control of his British governors. The General Assembly, however, espoused the principle of separation of powers and formally called for a third branch of government starting with the 1701 Judiciary Bill. In 1722, the appointed British governor needed the House to raise revenues. House leaders agreed to raise taxes in return for an independent Supreme Court. Until 1776, legislation and judicial decisions in Pennsylvania, as in various American colonies, were subject to review by the Privy Council of the United Kingdom in London.

From 1780–1808 there existed a Pennsylvania High Court of Errors and Appeals, which was the court of last resort in the Commonwealth.  After that court's dissolution in 1808, the Commonwealth's Supreme Court became, and remains, the court of last resort in the Pennsylvania judiciary.

The Supreme Court of Pennsylvania predates the United States Supreme Court by more than 100 years. Interpreting the Pennsylvania Constitution, it was one of the first appellate courts in the United States to claim the power to declare laws made by an elected legislative body unconstitutional (Respublica v. Duquet,   2 Yeates 493 (1799)).

Composition and rules
The court meets in three cities: Philadelphia, Pittsburgh, and Harrisburg.

The Pennsylvania Supreme Court consists of seven justices, each elected to ten year terms. Supreme Court judicial candidates may run on party tickets. The justice with the longest continuous service on the court automatically becomes Chief Justice. Justices must step down from the Supreme Court when they reach the age of 75 (at the end of the calendar year), but they may continue to serve part-time as "senior justices" on panels of the Commonwealth's lower appellate courts until they reach 78, the age of mandatory retirement.

Prior to 2002, judicial candidates in Pennsylvania were prohibited from expressing their views on disputed legal or political issues. However, after a similar law in Minnesota was struck down as unconstitutional (Republican Party of Minnesota v. White), the Pennsylvania rules were amended, and judicial candidates may now express political viewpoints as long as they do not "commit or appear to commit the candidate with respect to cases, controversies or issues that are likely to come before the court." (PA Code of Judicial Conduct, Canon 7 (B)(1)(c))

After the ten-year term expires, a statewide yes or no vote for retention is conducted. A judge who retained serves another ten-year term. If the judge is not retained, the governor, subject to the approval of the State Senate, appoints a temporary replacement until a special election can be held. As of 2005, only one judge has failed to win retention. Justice Russell M. Nigro received a majority of no votes in the election of 2005 and was replaced by Justice Cynthia Baldwin, who was appointed by Governor Rendell in 2005.

Only one Supreme Court Justice, Rolf Larsen, has been removed from office by impeachment. In 1994, the State House of Representatives handed down articles of impeachment consisting of seven counts of misconduct. A majority of the State Senate voted against Larsen in five of the seven counts but only one charge garnered the two-thirds majority needed to convict.

Under the 1874 Constitution and until the Pennsylvania state constitution of 1968, Supreme Court justices were elected to 21-year terms.  At the time, it was the longest term of any elected office in the United States.

Justices

Membership
The Supreme Court of Pennsylvania consists of seven members who are elected to ten-year terms as justices.

Current members

Vacancies and pending nominations

Important cases
 Eakin v. Raub (1825), in which the Court held that it has the authority of judicial review over state laws if they contradict the state constitution.
 Commonwealth of Pennsylvania v. Mimms (1975), in which the Court held that the unlawful possession charges as well as the relevant convictions and sentences against Harry Mimms over his illicit possession and concealed carry of an unlicensed firearm must be vacated and his case should be remanded for a new trial with the suppression of evidence due to violations of his Fourth Amendment rights; overturned by the Supreme Court of the United States in Pennsylvania v. Mimms, 434 U.S. 106 (1977).
 League of Women Voters of Pennsylvania v. Commonwealth of Pennsylvania (2018), in which the Court held that the 2011 congressional map by the state's legislature constituted an illegal, partisan gerrymander and consequently ordered the congressional map to be redrawn.
 Commonwealth of Pennsylvania v. Williams (2014), in which the Court held that the stay of execution against Terrence "Terry" Williams is overturned despite the lack of recusal on the part of then Chief Justice of the Supreme Court of Pennsylvania Ronald D. Castille for his prosecution of Williams as a former District Attorney of Philadelphia; overturned by the Supreme Court of the United States in Williams v. Pennsylvania, 579 U.S. ___ (2016).
 Commonwealth of Pennsylvania v. Clancy (2018), in which the Court held that there are three roles which district attorneys play as prosecutors: they are officers of the court, they are advocates for victims, and they are administrators of justice (identified to supplement matter at hand).
 Commonwealth of Pennsylvania v. Davis (2019), in which the Court held that the Fifth Amendment to the Constitution of the United States of America protects individuals from forcibly relinquishing the passwords of their digital accounts to law enforcement.
 Commonwealth of Pennsylvania v. Cosby (2021), in which the Court held that the sexual assault charges as well as the relevant convictions and sentences against disgraced celebrity Bill Cosby over his rape of Andrea Constand must be vacated, he must be discharged from prison, and any future litigation over such crime must be barred due to violations of his due process rights.
 Commonwealth of Pennsylvania v. Barr II (2021), in which the Court held that warrantless searches are unjustified if they are predicated upon the odor of cannabis alone.

See also

 State supreme court
 King's Bench jurisdiction
 Superior Court of Pennsylvania
 Commonwealth Court of Pennsylvania
 List of state and county courthouses in Pennsylvania
 Marbury v. Madison
 Andrea Constand v. William H. Cosby, Jr.

References

External links 
 Supreme Court of Pennsylvania

 
Pennsylvania State Capitol Complex
1722 establishments in Pennsylvania
Pennsylvania
1684 establishments in Pennsylvania
Courts and tribunals established in 1684
Courts and tribunals established in 1722